Brindisi is a town of Apulia, southern Italy.
The word, meaning "Toast" in Italian, may also refer to:

Places
Brindisi Montagna, an Italian municipality of Basilicata 
Province of Brindisi, an Italian province of Apulia

Music
Brindisi (music), a musical term

People
Anthony Brindisi, American politician
Lawrence of Brindisi (1559–1619), Roman Catholic saint
Leucius of Brindisi (?–180), Roman Catholic saint
Margaritus of Brindisi (1149–1197), Great Admiral of Sicily during the Third Crusade
Miguel Ángel Brindisi (born 1950), Argentine footballer
Remo Brindisi (1918–1996), Italian painter
Rodolfo Brindisi (1932–2009), Argentine actor

Other
Brindisi Rosso, an Italian wine of Apulia
New Basket Brindisi, an Italian basketball team based in the town of Brindisi
S.S.D. Città di Brindisi, an Italian football team based in the town of Brindisi
SMS Helgoland (1912), a ship renamed Brindisi in 1920

See also

Disambiguation pages with surname-holder lists
Italian-language surnames